Luan Rama is an Albanian diplomat, writer and researcher from Tirana who lives and works in Paris, France.

Career
Luan is author of many books dedicated to links between French and Albanian culture. As a former ambassador of Albania to France (1991–92) and UNESCO (1997–2001), he worked most for protecting and developing the European values of his country.

Works 
En Albanie:

 Fransua Miteran - romantizmi i pushtetit. “Dituria”, Tiranë, 1996;
 Metamorfoza e fjalës, për një deontologji të shtypit. “Albin”, Tiranë, 1997
 Shkëlqimet e meteorëve, mbi lojën e aktorit dhe aktoret franceze. “Toena”, Tiranë, 1998,
 Nën hijen e eklipsit, “Toena”, Tiranë, 2000
 Shqipëria frankofone, mbi traditat frankofone në Shqipëri. Botimet “Onufri”, Tiranë, 2001.
 Krushq të largët, ese, Botimet “Argeta”, Tiranë, 2002.
 Gjenerali De Gol, një legjendë e gjallë, mbi Charles de Gaulle. Botimet “Dudaj”, Tiranë, 2004
 Omer - Shtërgu nga Ballkani. Shtëpia Botuese “Korbi”, Tiranë, 2005
 Shtëpia e Shpresës, ese mbi Unesco-n, dialogun e qytetërimeve dhe bashkëpunimin me Shqipërinë. Shtëpia Botuese “Korbi”, Tiranë, 2005.
 Santa Quaranta, roman. Shtëpia Botuese “Argeta”, Tiranë, 2005.
 Dino - Shtegtari i Portës Sublime, Shtëpia Botuese Globus R., Tiranë, 2007.
 Camera obscura - origjina e botës, Botimet Globus R, Tiranë, 2007. Ribotuar nga “Les Livres Rama”, 2016.
 Në udhëkryqet e kohës, korrespondencë: Paris-Tiranë, I, Botimet Globus R, Tiranë, 2007 ; vëll.II 2009; vëll.III, 2013 ; vëll.IV, 2019
 Kur bie shi ti thua: është kohë e bukur, letra, Botimet Globus R, Tiranë, 2008.
 Kalorësit e stuhisë, Globus R., Tiranë, 2010.
 Durazzo-t, dozhët e purpurt, mbi familjen Durazzo, e emigruar më 1389, e cila i dha Republikës së Gjenovës 9 dozhë. Botimet Ideart, Tiranë, 2007.
 Pikëtakim me Jean Cocteau, ese, Botimet Globus R, Tiranë, 2009.
 Jean Moreas, poeti nga Morea, ese mbi poetin arvanitas dhe themeluesin e simbolizmit francez Jean Moreas, Botimet Globus R, Tiranë, 2009.
 Dorëshkrimet e Purpurta, mbi kodikët e vjetër të botës si dhe Kodikët e Beratit, Botimet Globus R, Tiranë, 2009.
 Parisi letrar, mbi itineraret e jetës tronditëse të disa prej shkrimtarëve parizianë si Rimbaud, Baudelaire, Hugo, Proust, Eluard, Camus, Duras etj., Botimet Globus R, Tiranë, 2009;
 Léon Rey… dhe gurët filluan të flasin, Botimet Globus R, Tiranë, 2010.
 Udhëtimi i mbramë i Arthur Rimbaud, Botimet Globus R, Tiranë, 2010.
 Bujtës të largët, mbi mbresat e udhëtarëve francezë gjatë shekullit XIX në Shqipëri, Botimet Klean, Tiranë, 2012.
 Pranvera dy hapa afër, mbi Heroin e Popullit Ali Demi, “Les Livres Rama”, Tiranë, 2012.
 Tek Frankët, mbi emigracionin shqiptar në Francë, “Les Livres Rama”, Tiranë, 2012.
 Shqipëria në luftën bizantino-normande, “Les Livres Rama”, Tiranë, 2013.
 Bonjour d’Albanie, “Les Livres Rama”, Tiranë, 2014
 Shqipëria e konsullit Auguste Dozon, “Les Livres Rama”, Tiranë, 2014.
 Shqiptarët e Léon Gérôme (Les Albanais de Léon Gérôme), bilingue, Luan Rama, «Les Livres Rama», Tiranë, 2016.
 Territoret e shpirtit, poezi, «Les Livres Rama», Tiranë, 2016.
 Përballë tablosë, ese, «Les Livres Rama», Tiranë, 2016.
 Vjeshta e Alberto Savianit, tregime, «Les Livres Rama», Tiranë, 2016.
 Legjenda shqiptare, Botimet «Albas», Tiranë, 2016.
 Vera, ky nektar i hyjnive dhe i njeriut, Les Livres Rama, Tiranë, 2017.
 Udhëtim në botën e pikturës shqiptare, «Albas», Tiranë, 2017.                      
 Shqipëria dhe shqiptarët në piktorët francezë të shekullit XIX (L’Albanie et les Albanais chez les peintres français du XIXe siècle), Les Livres Rama, Tiranë, 2017.
 Epistolari i Zaratës, Botimet ELVE, Tiranë, 2017.
 Ofshama e gargujve, Les Livres Rama, Tiranë, 2017.
 Dozon et l’Albanie - le consul qui aimait les contes, (mbi konsullin francez Auguste Dozon) Les Livres Rama, Tiranë, 2018.
 Poezi dashurie në kohë të vonë, recueil poétique, Les Livres Rama, Tiranë, 2018.
 Mbresa parisiane (Impressiones parisiènnes), essai, éd. UET, Tiranë, 2018.
 En Grèce, avec les Arvanites, Les Livres Rama, Tiranë, 2018.
 Burri që donte të vdiste, roman, Les Livres Rama, Tiranë, 2018.
 Porto Palermo, recueil poétique, Les Livres Rama, Tiranë, 2019.
 A l’étranger:
 Le long chemin sous le tunnel de Platon (Udha e gjatë në tunelin e Platonit), ese mbi fatin e artistit gjatë epokës totalitare në Shqipëri. Editions “Le Petit Véhicule”, 2001, Nantes, France, 978-2842731571
 Couvrez-moi avec un morceau de ciel (Mbulomëni me një copëz qiell), përmbledhje poetike në frëngjisht dhe shqip. Éditions “Le Petit Véhicule”, Nantes, 2002, 978-2842732745
 Pont entre deux Rives, (Ura midis dy brigjeve), ese. Éditions Société des Écrivains (mbi piktakimet. franko-shqiptare) Paris, 2005, 978-2748019087
 Valdet - sous le poids de la croix (Valdet - nën peshën e kryqit), Editions Digital Estampe, Rouen, 2011.
 Léon Rey à la découvert d’Apollonie, “Éditions Non Lieu”, Paris, 2012, 978-2352701323
 Les territoires de l’âme, recueil de poèmes, «Le Petit véhicule», Nantes, France, 2017.
 ΤΑ ΟΡΙΑ ΤΗΣ ΨΥΧΗΣ (Territoires de l’âme), ΕΚΔΟΣΕΙΣ ΑΝΑΓΝΩΣΤΗΣ, Athènes, 2018.
 L’épistolaire de Zarata, «Le Petit Véhicule», Nantes, France, 2019, 978-2371455672
 Zaratha’s Epistolary, roman, “Arcadia”, Melbourne, Australie, 2019. 978-1925801743

External links
association-albania.com
www.dw.de
Books

Year of birth missing (living people)
Place of birth missing (living people)
20th-century births
Albanian male writers
20th-century Albanian writers
21st-century Albanian writers
Albanian non-fiction writers
Ambassadors of Albania to France
Albanian art critics
Living people
People from Tirana
Permanent Delegates of Albania to UNESCO
Writers from Paris